David Wagner may refer to:
 David L. Wagner (born 1956), American entomologist
 David Wagner, lead singer of American rock group Crow
 David Wagner (soccer) (born 1971), German-American soccer player and coach
 David Wagner (tennis) (born 1974), American wheelchair tennis player
 David A. Wagner (born 1974), American computer scientist
 David Wagner (judge) (1826–1902), Justice of the Supreme Court of Missouri
 David Wagner (mathematics education) (born 1965), Canadian mathematics education researcher